Renato Repuyan (born 22 October 1944) is a Filipino judoka. He competed in the men's lightweight event at the 1972 Summer Olympics.

References

External links
 

1944 births
Living people
Filipino male judoka
Olympic judoka of the Philippines
Judoka at the 1972 Summer Olympics
Place of birth missing (living people)